ON24, Inc. is a San Francisco-based company that markets products and services based upon webcasting and virtual event and environment technology.

ON24 is a public company whose primary venture capital investors are Goldman Sachs, Gold Hill Capital, U.S. Venture Partners, Canaan Partners and Rho Ventures.

History
The company was founded in 1998 as a platform for companies to broadcast video press releases. It became a financial news streaming website but suffered financial losses after the early 2000s recession. In August 2002, ON24 closed its news operation but continued provided third-party content. After downsizing the company they reformatted their operations to provide streaming services for other companies. 

ON24 operates in the US, the UK, Australia, Singapore and Spain.

References

External links
Official homepage

Online mass media companies of the United States
American companies established in 1998
Mass media companies established in 1998
Companies listed on the New York Stock Exchange
2021 initial public offerings
Companies based in San Francisco